Egmont Bight is a shallow embayment at the southern end of the Encombe valley in Dorset, England. It is part of the Jurassic Coast.

Geology
The bay exposes good sections of Upper Kimmeridge shale and mudstone, with some bituminous shale and some small calcareous nodules.

There is no safe route down from the clifftop coast path, across Houns-tout cliff, nor around the Freshwater Steps promontory at the beach's western end.

See also 
 List of Dorset beaches

References

Gallery

Bays of Dorset
Hills of Dorset
Jurassic Coast
Corfe Castle